Sorin Marian Bușu (born 8 July 1989) is a Romanian professional footballer who plays as a left back for Liga II side Concordia Chiajna.

References

External links

1989 births
Living people
Sportspeople from Craiova
Romanian footballers
Association football fullbacks
Liga I players
Liga II players
FC U Craiova 1948 players
CSM Jiul Petroșani players
FC Petrolul Ploiești players
AFC Chindia Târgoviște players
CS Minaur Baia Mare (football) players
SCM Râmnicu Vâlcea players
CS Pandurii Târgu Jiu players
CS Gaz Metan Mediaș players
FC Hermannstadt players
FC Politehnica Iași (2010) players
CS Concordia Chiajna players